Odyssey is an album by American guitarist James Blood Ulmer, recorded and released in 1983 on the Columbia label. It was Ulmer's final of three albums recorded for a major label. The musicians on the album later re-united as The Odyssey Band and Odyssey The Band.

Reception
The AllMusic review by Steve Huey stated that "Odyssey stands as James Blood Ulmer's signature masterpiece, the purest and most accessible showcase for his bold, genre-clashing guitar vision... All the pieces come together to produce not only Ulmer's finest album, but a certified classic of the modern jazz avant-garde." It placed at #20 in The Village Voice'''s annual Pazz & Jop critics' poll. The album was listed as part of a suggested "core collection" by The Penguin Guide to Jazz.

Track listingAll compositions by James "Blood" Ulmer''
 "Church" – 4:54  
 "Little Red House" – 4:45  
 "Love Dance" – 5:05  
 "Are You Glad to Be in America?" – 3:40  
 "Election" – 3:26  
 "Odyssey" – 5:01  
 "Please Tell Her" – 4:10  
 "Swing & Things" – 4:32  
Recorded at the Power Station, New York in March–May 1983

Personnel
James "Blood" Ulmer – guitar, vocals
Charles Burnham – violin
Warren Benbow – drums

References

1983 albums
Columbia Records albums
James Blood Ulmer albums